Princess Munseong (15 August 1576 – 31 October 1623), of the Munhwa Yu clan, was the wife and queen consort of Yi Hon, King Gwanghae, the 15th Joseon monarch. She was queen consort of Joseon from 1608 until her husband's deposition in 1623, after which she was known as Deposed Queen Yu.

Biography
The future queen was born on 15 August 1576 during the reign of King Seonjo. Her father, Yu Ja-shin, was member of the Munhwa Yu clan. 

Through her mother, Lady Yu is a 4th great-granddaughter of King Jeongjong and Royal Consort Suk-ui of the Haengju Ki clan. Through her father, she is also a 5th great-granddaughter of King Jeongjong and Royal Consort Suk-ui of the Chungju Ji clan. 

At the age of 11 in 1587, she was selected to become the consort of Yi Hon, Prince Gwanghae, son of Seonjo, born to Kim Gongbin, senior 1st rank king's concubine. As Gwanghae's wife, she was given the royal title of Princess Consort Munseong (문성군부인, Munseong Gunbuin). When Gwanghae became the crown prince in 1592, she was elevated to the crown princess’ rank at the age of 16. 16 years later, Gwanghae ascended to the throne as the fifteenth Joseon king in 1608 and she became queen consort.

As queen's father, he was given the title Internal Prince Munyang (문양부원군). Her mother was member of the Dongrae Jeong clan, as queen's mother, she was given the title Internal Princess Consort Bongwon (봉원부부인).

On April 6, 1623, Gwanghaegun was deposed in a coup by the Westerners faction. The coup directed by Kim Yu took place at night. The King fled but was captured later. His nephew, Injo, was placed on the throne as the 16th Joseon monarch. As deposed king's wife, she lost her status as queen consort and known as Deposed Queen Yu. She was deposed and exiled to Ganghwa Island, together with Gwanghae. Her son, Yi Ji, the deposed Crown Prince, tried to escape with his wife but failed, resulting in them committing suicide. Deposed Queen Yu passed away in the same year after seven months of living in exile.

Deposed Queen Yu was buried in Jeokseong, Yangju, Gyeonggi Province, and there is no known tomb.

Family
Parent

 Father − Yu Ja-shin (유자신) (December 1541 – 7 February 1612)  
 1) Grandfather − Yu Jam (류잠, 柳潛) (1509 - 1576)
 2) Great-Grandfather − Yu Su-cheon (류수천, 柳壽千)
 3) Great-Great-Grandfather − Yu Je-geun (류제근, 柳悌根)
 1) Grandmother − Lady Jeong of the Hadong Jeong clan (1505 – 1587) (하동 정씨)
 Uncle - Yu Deok-shin (유덕신, 柳德新) (1548 - 1617)
 Cousin - Yu Tae-hyeong (유태형, 柳泰亨)
 Mother − Jeong Yang-jeong, Internal Princess Consort Bongwon of the Dongrae Jeong clan (1541 – 1620) (정양정 봉원부부인 동래 정씨, 鄭楊貞 蓬原府夫人 東萊 鄭氏)
 1) Grandfather − Jeong Yu-Gil (30 November 1515 – 28 September 1588) (정유길)
 1) Grandmother − Won Dae-eun-gae, Lady Won of the Wonju Won clan (원대은개 정경부인 원주 원씨, 元大隱介 貞敬夫人 原州 元氏) (1514 - ?)

Siblings

 Older brother − Yu Hui-kaeng (류희갱, 柳希鏗)
 Older brother − Yu Hui-dam (류희담, 柳希聃) (1563 - 1614)
 Older brother − Yu Hui-bun (류희분, 柳希奮) (1564 - 1623)
 Nephew − Yu Myeong-rib (류명립, 柳命立)
 Older brother − Yu Hui-bal (류희발, 柳希發) (1568 - 1623)
 Niece − Lady Yu of the Munhwa Yu clan (문화 류씨) 
 Nephew-in-law − Yi Mu (이무, 李袤)
 Older sister − Yu Ok-yeong, Lady Yu of the Munhwa Yu clan (류옥영 문화 류씨, 柳玉英)
 Older sister − Yu Jung-yeong, Lady Yu of the Munhwa Yu clan (류중영 문화 류씨, 柳重英)
Older brother − Yu Hui-ryang (류희량, 柳希亮) (1575 - 1628)
 Younger sister − Yu So-yeong, Lady Yu of the Munhwa Yu clan (류소영 문화 류씨, 柳小英)
 Younger brother − Yu Hui-an (류희안, 柳希安) (1581 - 1638)

Consort

 Yi Hon, King Gwanghae (4 June 1575 – 7 August 1641) (조선 광해군)

Issue

 Unnamed child (? – 1592)
 First son (1596 – 1596)
Son − Yi Ji, Deposed Crown Prince (31 December 1598 – 22 July 1623) (이지 폐세자)
Daughter-in-law − Deposed Crown Princess Consort Park of the Miryang Park clan (1598 – May 1623) (폐빈 박씨, 廢嬪 朴氏)
Unnamed granddaughter (군주) (1614 - 1614)
Third son (1601 – 1603)

In popular culture
Portrayed by Jang Seo-hee in the 1995 KBS2 TV Series West Palace.
Portrayed by Sa Kang in the 2003-2004 SBS TV series King's Woman.
Portrayed by Han Hyo-joo in the 2012 movie Masquerade.
Portrayed by Lee Si-a in the 2013 MBC TV series Hur Jun, The Original Story.
Portrayed by Kim Hee-jung in the 2014 KBS TV series The King's Face.
Portrayed by Kim Hyo-seo in the 2015 MBC TV series Splendid Politics.
Portrayed by Lee Se-young in the 2019 tvN TV series The Crowned Clown.
Portrayed by Park Min-jung the 2019 KBS2 TV series The Tale of Nokdu.

References

 

17th-century Korean people
1576 births
1623 deaths
Royal consorts of the Joseon dynasty
Korean queens consort